Alejandro Urgelles Guibot (July 2, 1951 in Santiago de Cuba – October 6, 1984) was a basketball player from Cuba, who won the bronze medal with the men's national team at the 1972 Summer Olympics in Munich, West Germany.

References
Alejandro Urgelles Guibot's profile at databaseOlympics

1951 births
1984 deaths
Sportspeople from Santiago de Cuba
Cuban men's basketball players
1970 FIBA World Championship players
1974 FIBA World Championship players
Basketball players at the 1972 Summer Olympics
Basketball players at the 1976 Summer Olympics
Basketball players at the 1980 Summer Olympics
Olympic bronze medalists for Cuba
Olympic medalists in basketball
Basketball players at the 1971 Pan American Games
Pan American Games bronze medalists for Cuba
Medalists at the 1972 Summer Olympics
Olympic basketball players of Cuba
Pan American Games medalists in basketball
Medalists at the 1971 Pan American Games
20th-century Cuban people